Glyn Warren Philpot  (5 October 1884 – 16 December 1937) was an English painter and sculptor, best known for his portraits of contemporary figures such as Siegfried Sassoon and Vladimir Rosing.

Gallery 

Philpot, Glyn